Mosterøy is an island in Stavanger municipality in Rogaland county, Norway.  The  island lies just southwest of the island of Rennesøy.  The smaller islands of Sokn, Bru, and Åmøy lie to the south of Mosterøy and the islands of Klosterøy and Fjøløy lie to the west of Mosterøy.  All of these islands are connected together and to the mainland city of Stavanger by a series of undersea tunnels and bridges.  The Mastrafjord Tunnel connects Mosterøy to the island of Rennesøy and the Askjesund Bridge connects Mosterøy to the island of Sokn.  Both the tunnel and bridge are part of the European route E39 highway.

The island of Mosterøy has been part of Rennesøy municipality for a long time, but in 1884 it became a part of the new municipality of Mosterøy which encompassed the island plus several surrounding islands.  This independent municipality existed until 1965 when it was merged back into Rennesøy municipality. Then in 2020, the island became a part of the large Stavanger Municipality.

Mosterøy is a well-cultivated island, with significant livestock and horticulture. There are residential areas all over the island, but especially in the east.

See also
List of islands of Norway

References

Islands of Stavanger